María de la Concepción Núñez Garrido (1943 – 26 June 2009) was a Spanish actress.

Biography
Conchita Núñez began her career on the radio in the 1950s, and in the early 1960s she switched to acting.

She made a dozen films, including Valiente by Luis Marquina (1964), Proceso a la conciencia by Agustín Navarro (1964), and Las cicatrices by Pedro Lazaga (1967).

Despite this body of work, the Spanish public recognizes her less for her face than for her voice. She worked in dubbing in the 1960s, and began to do so exclusively in 1973, devoting more than 40 years (until a few months before her death) to this facet of film and television performance. Man (1978), Kira in Once Upon a Time... Space (1982), and Tom Sawyer in The Adventures of Tom Sawyer (1980). She also dubbed, among hundreds of others, the actresses Carole André (Mariana) on Sandokan (1976), Linda Evans (Krystle Carrington) on Dynasty (1982), Victoria Principal (Pamela Ewing) on Dallas (1989), and Joanna Cassidy (Margaret Chenowith) on Six Feet Under (2004).

References

External links
 
 Conchita Núñez at Eldoblaje

1943 births
2009 deaths
20th-century Spanish actresses
21st-century Spanish actresses
Spanish stage actresses
Spanish voice actresses